Polygnamptia is a genus of moths of the family Erebidae. The genus was described by Schaus in 1914.

Species
Polygnamptia chloristicta Schaus, 1914 French Guiana
Polygnamptia venipunctata Dognin, 1920

References

Calpinae